Maryinsko is a village in Plyussky District of Pskov Oblast, Russia.

References

Rural localities in Pskov Oblast